Daniel Zacher (born 4 November 1988 in Dresden) is a German former footballer who played as a goalkeeper.

Career

Zacher played as a youth and reserve for his hometown club, Dynamo Dresden, before joining SV Babelsberg 03 in 2008. He initially served as understudy to Marian Unger, as the club rose from the Regionalliga Nord to the 3. Liga, but managed 17 appearances in the 2011–12 season and was given the number 1 shirt after Unger left the club in 2012. However, with the arrival of Frederic Löhe, he found himself on the substitutes bench once again, and left the club in January 2013, retiring from the game shortly after.

External links
 

1988 births
Living people
German footballers
Dynamo Dresden II players
Dynamo Dresden players
SV Babelsberg 03 players
3. Liga players
Association football goalkeepers
Footballers from Dresden